Marlfield GAA is a Gaelic Athletic Association club located in Marlfield, County Tipperary in Ireland. The club is part of the South division of Tipperary GAA. They have been South Tipperary Senior Hurling Champions on four occasions.

Honours
South Tipperary Senior Hurling Championship:
Winner (4): 1960, 1962, 1964, 1970
South Tipperary Junior Hurling Championship:
Winner (4): 1954, 1958, 1976, 1983
South Tipperary Under-21 B Hurling Championship:
 1999

Famous players

 Theo English

References

External links
Official Site
GAA Info Website
Tipperary GAA site

Gaelic games clubs in County Tipperary